FC Krukan is a Swedish football club located in Stockholm.

Background
FC Krukan currently plays in Division 4 Stockholm Mellersta which is the sixth tier of Swedish football. They play their home matches at the Zinkensdamms IP in Stockholm.

The club is affiliated to Stockholms Fotbollförbund.

Season to season

Footnotes

External links
 FC Krukan – Official website
 FC Krukan on Facebook

Football clubs in Stockholm
1991 establishments in Sweden